Clube Desportivo de Nacala, or simply Nacala, is a Mozambique multi sports club from Nacala especially known for its football.

Desportivo de Nacala was founded on 24 July 1964.

The team plays in Moçambola.

Stadium
Currently the team plays at the 5,000 capacity Estadio 25 de Junho.

References

External links

Soccerway

Football clubs in Mozambique